Cayetano Valdés y Flores Bazán (1767–1835) was a commander of the Spanish Navy, explorer, and captain general who served in the French Revolutionary and Napoleonic Wars, fighting for both sides at different times due to the changing fortunes of Spain in the conflict. He took part in a number of naval battles, including the Great Siege of Gibraltar, the Battle of Cape St Vincent, and the Battle of Trafalgar. He was an explorer, most notable in the Pacific Northwest, where he and Dionisio Alcalá Galiano conducted the first circumnavigation of Vancouver Island, in partial cooperation with George Vancouver. Over his long career he achieved the highest ranks in the Spanish Navy, eventually being named Captain General of Cadiz and Captain General of the Spanish Navy.

Early career
He was born in Seville in 1767, and was the nephew of Antonio Valdés y Fernández Bazán. Cayetano Valdés joined the Naval Academy in Cadiz as a guardiamarina (midshipman) in 1781. After finishing his studies he sailed with the fleet of Luis de Córdova and in 1782 saw action in the naval battle with the English fleet under Admiral Richard Howe, during the Great Siege of Gibraltar. In 1783 Valdés took part in a Spanish operation against Algiers in an effort to crush the rampant piracy and white slavery sponsored by the Dey.

Malaspina and Galiano expeditions
In 1789 Valdés achieved a position as a lieutenant (teniente de navío) on the scientific expedition of Alejandro Malaspina. In 1791 Malaspina gave him command of the "goleta" Mexicana and orders to explore the Strait of Juan de Fuca and Strait of Georgia in an expedition under the command of another of Malaspina's officers, Dionisio Alcalá Galiano The term "goleta" is Spanish for a schooner-like ship but not necessary rigged as a schooner. The Mexicana began rigged as a topsail schooner but was changed during the voyage to a brig. During the summer of 1792 Valdés and Galiano circumnavigated Vancouver Island, meeting George Vancouver along the way. After working together for a time the two expeditions split up and arrived at Nootka Sound separately. Because Valdés and Galiano had begun their voyage around the island from Nootka Sound while Vancouver had begun at the Strait of Juan de Fuca, the Spaniards became the first Europeans to fully circumnavigate the island.

Napoleonic Wars
In 1797 Valdés was in command of the ship of the line Pelayo at the Battle of Cape St Vincent when the British fleet of Sir John Jervis with Horatio Nelson defeated the Spanish. For valor during battle Valdés was promoted to Captain (capitán de navío) and gained a reputation as a strong fighter.

By the terms of the Third Treaty of San Ildefonso the Pelayo was given to Napoleonic France and Valdés was given command of the Neptuno, then stationed at Brest, France. In 1801 he conveyed the commander of Spanish forces in Hispaniola on a joint Franco-Spanish operation against the rebellious slaves in Haiti during the Haitian Revolution. After stopping in Havana he returned to Cadiz in 1802, where he was appointed brigadier de la Real Armada.

In 1805, Valdés and the Neptuno were based in Cadiz as commodore of a squadron of ships, and so they were called on to fight when the French fleet attempted to make the open sea during the Trafalgar Campaign. On the 21 October the combined fleet was chased down and attacked in the Battle of Trafalgar. Valdés fought hard, his ship was leading the combined fleet and turned back into the melee behind him. Unfortunately the French ships accompanying the Neptuno under Admiral Dumanior did not turn back and so the isolated Neptuno was surrounded and suffered great damage. Valdés himself was seriously wounded and eventually lost consciousness. The disabled Neptuno was eventually forced to surrender.

Although his ship was wrecked in the storm which followed the battle, Valdés and many of his shipmates survived, and thus he was in England when the Peninsular War broke out in Spain in 1808. Immediately released and returning home, Valdés enlisted in the land army and participated in a battle at Espinosa de los Monteros on the staff of General Blake but mainly contented himself with administration and involvement in the Cortes of Cádiz. For this service during the war he was appointed the Captain General in charge of Cadiz, but on the return of Ferdinand VII of Spain, he was stripped of his titles and was lucky to escape death during the repression which followed the restitution of an absolute monarchy.

Later life
In the uprising of 1820 he was again heavily involved on the liberal side, and defended the Liberal Government although without much success, proving more adept as the short-lived government's minister for war. Under a sentence of death, he fled to Gibraltar and then to England, where he lived for ten years. In 1833 Isabella II of Spain recalled Valdés and named him Captain General of Cadiz and later of the Spanish Navy.

Vayetano Valdés died on June 6, 1835, in San Fernando, Cadiz.

Legacy
Valdes Island, an island on the Strait of Georgia, is named for Cayetano Valdés, as is Cayetano Point on that island's southwestern end. Other features on Valdes Island that relate to the 1792 voyage include Mexicana Hill, named for Valdés's ship the Mexicana, Dibuxante Point, named for the artist José Cardero who sailed on board the Mexicana, and Vernaci Point, for Juan Vernacci y Retamal, one of Valdés's officers.

References

External links
 This article is based on a translation of an article from the Spanish Wikipedia.
A portrait of Cayetano Valdés, by Arturo Pérez-Reverte

1767 births
1835 deaths
People from Seville
Captain generals of the Navy
Spanish generals
Spanish admirals
Spanish history in the Pacific Northwest
Spanish explorers of the Pacific
Spanish explorers of North America
18th-century explorers
18th-century Spanish people
19th-century Spanish people
Explorers of British Columbia
Spanish commanders of the Napoleonic Wars